Ecnomiohyla rabborum, commonly known as Rabbs' fringe-limbed treefrog, is a possibly extinct species of frog in the family Hylidae. They were relatively large frogs that inhabited the forest canopies of central Panama. Like other members of the genus Ecnomiohyla, they were capable of gliding by spreading their enormous and fully webbed hands and feet during descent. The males of the species were highly territorial and would guard water-filled tree holes used for breeding. They were also the ones responsible for guarding and caring for the young, including providing food. They were the only known species of frog where the tadpoles derived nutrition by feeding on the skin cells of their fathers.

The species was discovered in 2005 and formally described in 2008 by a team of herpetologists led by Joseph R. Mendelson III. It was named in honor of the conservationists and herpetologists George B. Rabb and Mary S. Rabb. It was officially listed as Critically Endangered by the International Union for Conservation of Nature and Natural Resources (IUCN) by 2009. It is believed that the species became extinct in the wild mainly because of an epidemic of Batrachochytrium dendrobatidis in its native range. Despite the efforts of several conservation teams, captive breeding programs all failed. The last known female of the species died in 2009. She was survived by two other individuals, both males. On February 17, 2012, one of the two was euthanized at Zoo Atlanta in Georgia due to failing health. The last known surviving member of the species, an adult male named Toughie, resided at the Atlanta Botanical Garden until his death September 26, 2016.

Description
Ecnomiohyla rabborum was a relatively large frog. The head was wider than the body and flattened at the top. The snout was moderately long with nostrils protruding from the sides near the tip. Viewed from the top, the snout was more or less elliptical in shape. The canthal ridge was concave (curves outward) and had thick and rounded edges. The loreal regions were similarly concave. The tympana was smaller in diameter than the eyes and slightly inclined. Smooth glandular structures (known as the supratympanic fold) extended over the tympana from the eyes to the edges of the lower jaw. The tongue was round, and the species possessed narrowly spaced ovoid groups of pre-vomerine teeth.

The arms were short and stout with very large hands. There were no skin folds on the wrists, though a scalloped fringe of skin was present from the elbows to just below the discs on the fourth fingers. The fingers were all relatively short with large flattened discs on the tips. The discs on the second, third, and fourth fingers were about the same diameter as the tympana. Small protrusions known as tubercles were present on the underside of the hands. On the first finger, the tubercles on the tipmost joints were elliptical in shape. On the second and third fingers, the tubercles below the finger joints (subarticular tubercles) were smaller than that on the fourth fingers. There were no tubercles on the palms of the hands though elongated flat tubercles were present behind the bases of the inner fingers (the "thumbs"). Numerous small and round tubercles were also present in between the joints of the fingers. The fingers were more or less fully webbed.

The hind limbs were slender and of moderate length. Like the hands, the feet were very large. When resting, the heels of the legs barely overlapped each other. If stretched forward up the length of the body, the tibiotarsal articulation (the "ankle") would reach beyond the eyes. Like the arms, a fringe of scalloped skin also extended from the heel to the base of the foot on each leg, continuing as a low ridge to the base of the disc of the fifth toe. The toes, like the fingers, possessed flattened discs at the tips, though they were slightly smaller in diameter. The tubercles on the tipmost joints of the fifth toes were larger than all of the other subarticular tubercles on the toes. Interspersed between them were numerous small and conical tubercles. The toes were also fully webbed.

The skin of E. rabborum was granular in texture and predominantly a mottled brown. The upper surfaces of the limbs was also mottled brown while the rear surfaces of the thighs were a pale yellow. The chin and upper chest was distinctively brown, though the rest of the underside of the body was mostly white speckled with irregular brown spots. The eyelids and upper surfaces of the limbs and back were studded with green flecks, the appearance and positions of which could be changed by the animal voluntarily (metachrosis). The irises of the eyes was uniformly reddish brown.

During the breeding season, adult males of the species were characterized by greatly enlarged upper arms (humerus) with a bony ridge covered by skin and black keratinized spines. Spines were also present on the upper surface of the area just before the thumbs. These spines were likely used during amplexus.

Taxonomy
Ecnomiohyla rabborum is classified under the genus Ecnomiohyla of the treefrog subfamily Hylinae, family Hylidae. It was first described in 2008 by a team of herpetologists consisting of Joseph R. Mendelson III, Jay M. Savage, Edgardo Griffith, Heidi Ross, Brian Kubicki, and Ronald Gagliardo. During its discovery in 2005, it was initially misidentified by the team as Ecnomiohyla fimbrimembra, but Kubicki recognized it as a new species. The type specimens were raised in captivity. They were obtained from tadpoles collected by Griffith and Ross from an area near El Valle de Antón, Coclé, Panama on July 15, 2005.

The generic name Ecnomiohyla comes from Greek ecnomios ("marvelous" or "unusual") and Hylas, the companion of Hercules. The specific name is in honor of the conservationists and herpetologists George B. Rabb and Mary S. Rabb.

Distribution
Ecnomiohyla rabborum was known only from the cloud forests of the Pacific-facing slopes of the mountains above the town of El Valle de Antón in central Panama, between the provinces of Coclé and Panamá. However, it has not been observed in the area since 2007.

Ecology and biology
Ecnomiohyla rabborum, like other members of the genus, lived in the forest canopy. They were nocturnal and fed on insects. When threatened, they were capable of gliding through the air by leaping from their perch and fully stretching their massive webbed hands and feet. They could also steer the direction of their descent.

The males of the species were highly territorial, defending water-filled tree holes used for breeding. The advertising calls of E. rabborum males consisted of "warm up" owl-like calls of three to five notes immediately followed by a single "grrrrrck", which some called a barking sound. The calling bouts happened only at night and lasted for about one to two minutes, with the intervals longer at the beginning and gradually becoming shorter. Aside from attracting females, the calls may also have served to warn off competing males. Mating occurred throughout the year, though the calls seem to have intensified two to three days before or after a full moon and during the peak mating season from mid-March to May.

Females laid their eggs inside the water-filled tree holes, attached to the wood or bark just above the waterline. After laying their eggs, the females left while the males remained to guard them. Males may have mated more than once, and a single tree hole could contain an egg clutch of 60 to 200 eggs. The eggs would hatch into large tadpoles with dorsoventrally flattened bodies and short, blunt snouts. The eyes were situated on top and directed towards the sides. They were not visible when the tadpole was viewed from below. The nostrils were situated about two thirds of the way between the eyes and snout. The mouth was small and located at the bottom of the tip of the snout. Small papillae were present along the sides of the upper lip and along the entire margin of the lower lip. The beaks were robust and with small serrations. The spiracle opened on the middle of the left side of the body. The tail was slender with fins that did not extend to the body. The tadpoles were predominantly pale brown in color. The tadpoles were so large and numerous that at times, there appeared to be more tadpoles than water in the tree holes.

E. rabborum was remarkable in that the males appeared to provide nutrition to the tadpoles directly. During the day, the males backed into the tadpole-filled water of the tree holes and remained in that half-submerged state until night. During this time, the tadpoles swam around them, rasping small pieces of skin from their fathers' backs and eating them. This was the first observed instance of any frog species doing this, though it was similar to the way some female caecilians feed their young.

Conservation

At the time of its collection, the herpetologists who later described Ecnomiohyla rabborum were already aware of the encroaching threat of the chytrid fungus Batrachochytrium dendrobatidis (colloquially referred to by biologists as "Bd") in Panama. The fungus causes an infectious amphibian disease called chytridiomycosis, which has been linked to the massive decline and extinction of amphibian species in certain parts of the world; including the Americas, Australia, and New Zealand. Infected amphibians can display a wide variety of symptoms, usually including lethargic and abnormal behavior, convulsions, peeling skin, ulcers, and hemorrhaging; eventually resulting in death. The origin of the disease is unknown, but there is speculation that it may have been introduced throughout the world via importation of the African clawed frog (Xenopus laevis).

In 2006, in the hopes of saving the species, the then undescribed specimens of E. rabborum that teams of herpetologists collected were sent to captive breeding facilities in the El Valle Amphibian Conservation Centre (EVACC), Zoo Atlanta, and the Atlanta Botanical Garden. However, these efforts ultimately proved to be futile. The frogs thrived in these facilities but never mated. The last female died in 2009 in the Atlanta Botanical Garden.

In an essay regarding the rapid extinctions of amphibians happening around the world, Joseph R. Mendelson III, the Curator of Herpetology in Zoo Atlanta and one of the scientists who first described E. rabborum, stated that herpetologists in the last 20 years are becoming "forensic taxonomists". Species are now being described just before or even after they have already gone extinct. On the situation of E. rabborum, he comments:

Two males in Zoo Atlanta and Atlanta Botanical Garden survived until February 17, 2012, when one of them had to be euthanized to prevent suffering after a decline in health and to preserve valuable genetic material. Though the frog could have been allowed to die naturally, amphibians decompose rapidly. If it had died during the night when no personnel were present, it could have proven impossible to extract genetic material. The Deputy Director of the Zoo, Dwight Lawson commented:

The last known observation of the frog in the wild was that of a single male heard calling (but not seen) in 2007. At the time of its last survey in 2009, the IUCN classified E. rabborum as Critically Endangered. More recent estimates deem the species effectively extinct in the wild. A single adult male named Toughie at the Atlanta Botanical Garden was the last known survivor of the species until his death.

See also

Decline in amphibian populations
Chytridiomycosis
Holocene extinction
Anthropocene

References

"Rabbs' Fringe-limbed Treefrog Declared Extinct." Rabbs' Fringe-limbed Treefrog Declared Extinct. RiVista, n.d. Web. 22 Nov. 2016. <http://www.reptilesmagazine.com/Rabbs-Fringe-limbed-Treefrog-Declared-Extinct-trending/>.

External links

Rabbs' fringe-limbed treefrog  (Ecnomiohyla rabborum) at ARKive
Rabbs' fringe-limbed treefrog at Zoo Atlanta
Video of Rabbs' fringe-limbed treefrog exhibit by Zoo Atlanta
Video of the last known Rabbs' fringe-limbed treefrog by the Atlanta Botanical Garden

rabborum
Amphibians of Panama
Endemic fauna of Panama
Amphibian extinctions since 1500
Amphibians described in 2008
Taxa named by Jay M. Savage